is a 1986 side-scrolling shooter game by Irem for the Nintendo Entertainment System. Although published in North America directly by Irem itself, technical support inquiries for the game was handled in this region by Broderbund since Irem did not have an American branch at the time.

Plot
Aliens who rule the planet Neptune realize that they have run out of their primary source of nutrition, "man-ham livestock," and decide to invade Earth to feed off the humans. They melt the polar ice caps, causing entire continents to sink under the ocean. The General of the Earth Defense Army begs a pirate called Narikeen to strike back at the aliens with his submarine, Sqoon. Narikeen, being of an evil nature, laughs at the pleas of the general, but reluctantly agrees to exterminate the aliens.

Gameplay

The player is given Sqoon, a pink submarine, and must use it to destroy the aliens and rescue captured human survivors while trying to avoid coming into contact with enemies and running out of fuel. To accomplish this, Sqoon is equipped with missiles to attack enemies, and an ice ball bomb attack to destroy facilities and release captured humans. When Sqoon has reached its maximum capacity of nine humans, the player must discharge survivors onto an island which will then release power-ups and replenish fuel. Sqoon has a fuel supply which must be replenished every sixty seconds. Failure to do so results in the loss of a life.

Adaptation 
Sqoon was adapted into a Manga titled , published in the Famitsu Comics collection from March 1989, drawn by Tamakichi Sakura.

See also
In the Hunt

References

External links
Sqoon at Hardcore Gaming 101
Sqoon at classicgaming.com

1986 video games
Naval video games
Nintendo Entertainment System games
Nintendo Entertainment System-only games
Magical Company games
Irem games
Horizontally scrolling shooters
Video games developed in Japan
Single-player video games
Submarine simulation video games